Aleksandr Tsertsvadze (born 7 October 1977) is a Georgian wrestler. He competed in the men's Greco-Roman 54 kg at the 2000 Summer Olympics.

References

1977 births
Living people
Male sport wrestlers from Georgia (country)
Olympic wrestlers of Georgia (country)
Wrestlers at the 2000 Summer Olympics
Place of birth missing (living people)